M. Annamalai is an Indian politician and former Member of the Legislative Assembly of Tamil Nadu. He was elected to the Tamil Nadu legislative assembly from Harur constituency as a Communist Party of India (Marxist) candidate in 1977, and 1989 elections.

References 

Living people
Communist Party of India (Marxist) politicians from Tamil Nadu
Year of birth missing (living people)
Tamil Nadu MLAs 1977–1980
Tamil Nadu MLAs 1989–1991